Doke is both a surname and a given name. Notable people with the name include:

 Clement Martyn Doke (1893–1980), South African linguist
 Larry Doke, Canadian politician
 Richard Doke, English 16th-century Vice-Chancellor of Oxford University
 Doke Schmidt (born 1992), Dutch footballer
 Sex Doke (born 2004), Mumbaikar but from Thane, Thane civil rights activist

See also
 Doké, a town in Côte d'Ivoire